The 2016 Budapest bombing occurred on 24 September when a young man detonated a nail bomb to kill two patrolling police officers. A policeman and a policewoman (the latter, coincidentally, the poster face of the Hungarian police's recruiting campaign) suffered injuries but survived the attack. After the incident the police chief in charge announced a full-scale investigation and promised to give 10 million HUF to the ones who reported the perpetrator. According to Zsolt Molnár, the chairman of the National Security Commission of the Hungarian Parliament, the attack unlikely had anything to do with other terror-related incidents in Europe in 2016.

Perpetrator
The alleged perpetrator, László Gergely P., was caught on 19 October 2016 by the Counter Terrorism Centre in Keszthely. The 23-year-old man is a Hungarian citizen without any kind of criminal antecedents; his father was earlier the mayor of Karmacs, a small village in Zala county. According to prosecutors, he planned to blackmail the Hungarian Ministry of Interior for €1 million.

Trial
The perpetrator's trial started on January 31, 2018. On September 12, he was sentenced to prison for life with the possibility of parole after 30 years.

References

External link

 SkyNews.com

2016 in Hungary
Terrorist incidents in Europe in 2016
Terrorist incidents in Hungary
2010s in Budapest
September 2016 crimes in Europe
September 2016 events in Europe